is a chain of hotels headquartered in Chiyoda, Tokyo, Japan. Their flagship hotel, the Hotel New Otani Tokyo opened in 1964. New Otani Hotels operates 18 hotels in, and 2 hotels outside, Japan.

Group hotels

Japan

Hokkaidō
Hotel New Otani Inn Sapporo (Sapporo)
Kantō
Chiba Prefecture
 Hotel New Otani Makuhari (Chiba, Chiba)
Tokyo
 Hotel New Otani Tokyo (Chiyoda)
 New Otani Inn Tokyo (Osaki area of Shinagawa)
Kanagawa Prefecture
 New Otani Inn Yokohama (Yokohama)
Chūbu
Niigata Prefecture
 Hotel New Otani Nagaoka (Nagaoka)
 The Italia-Ken (Niigata)
 Yuzawa New Otani Hotel (Yuzawa)
 NASPA New Otani Resort (Yuzawa)
Shizuoka Prefecture
 Grand Hotel Hamamatsu (Hamamatsu)
Toyama Prefecture
 Unazuki New Otani Hotel (Kurobe)
 Hotel New Otani Takaoka (Takaoka)
Kansai
 Hyōgo Prefecture
 New Otani Kobe Harborland (Kobe)
 Osaka Prefecture
 Hotel New Otani Osaka (Osaka)
Chūgoku
 Tottori Prefecture
 Hotel New Otani Tottori (Tottori)
Kyūshū
 Fukuoka Prefecture
 Hotel New Otani Hakata (Fukuoka)
 Kumamoto Prefecture
 Hotel New Otani Kumamoto (Kumamoto)
 Saga Prefecture
 Hotel New Otani Saga (Saga)

Overseas
 People's Republic of China
 Hotel New Otani Chang Fu Gong (Beijing)
 United States
 New Otani Kaimana Beach Hotel (Waikiki, Hawaii)

Associate hotels

Associate hotels in Japan
 Tohoku
 Yamagata Prefecture
 Yamagata Grand Hotel (Yamagata)
 Chūbu
 Ishikawa Prefecture
 Kanazawa New Grand Hotel (Kanazawa)
 Kansai
 Shiga Prefecture
 Hotel New Omi (Omihachiman)

Former properties
 The New Otani Hotel & Garden Los Angeles (Los Angeles, California, United States) (1977–2007)
 Vitosha New Otani (Sofia, Bulgaria) (1979–1997)

 Hotel New Otani Singapore (Singapore) (1984–2004)

References

External links

 

Hospitality companies of Japan
Service companies based in Tokyo
Buildings and structures with revolving restaurants
1963 establishments in Japan
Hotel chains in Japan
Japanese brands